Augusta Law School was a law school in Augusta, Georgia which operated from 1833 to 1854.  It was the first law school in Georgia and in the Deep South.  It was modeled after the influential Litchfield Law School, and was founded by William Tracy Gould, a graduate of Litchfield and the son of its director, James Gould.

References
 Hunter, Thomas Rogers. "Litchfield On The Savannah: William Tracy Gould And The Deep South's First Law School." Journal of Southern Legal History 19.(2011): 177–263.

Defunct private universities and colleges in Georgia (U.S. state)
Law schools in Georgia (U.S. state)
Defunct law schools